The 1909 Elon Fightin' Christians football team represented Elon College (now Elon University) in the 1909 college football season. In their inaugural season, the team was coached by Reddy Rowe, and outscored their opponents 62–23.

Elon would not field a team for the next nine years, returning to the field for the 1919 season.

Schedule

References

Elon
Elon Phoenix football seasons
Elon Fightin' Christians football